Giorgio Belladonna (7 June 1923 – 12 May 1995) was an Italian bridge player, one of the greatest of all time. He won 16 world championship titles with the Blue Team, playing with Walter Avarelli from 1956 to 1969 and later with Benito Garozzo. A leading theoretician, he was the principal inventor of the Roman Club bidding system, from 1956, and with Benito Garozzo after 1969 created Super Precision, a complex strong club based method. He was known as much for his mercurial temperament as for the brilliance of his card play; see, for example, Belladonna coup.

Belladonna died of lung cancer, according to his daughter, on 12 May 1995 in Rome. He was survived by his wife Maria Antoinetta, one daughter, one son, and four grandchildren. 

Alan Truscott described him as "a cheerful extrovert" and "normally unflappable at the table". He had been "a potential soccer star, but World War II interrupted that career path". He worked in the Social Security Administration until 1970.

Bridge accomplishments

World championships
Wins
Belladonna won 16 world championships, all as a member of the Italy open .
 Bermuda Bowl (13) 1957, 1958, 1959, 1961, 1962, 1963, 1965, 1966, 1967 and 1969; 1973, 1974, 1975
 World Team Olympiad (3) 1964, 1968, 1972

From 1957 to 1969 the Blue Team with nearly uniform personnel and partnerships won all 10 Bermuda Bowl tournaments (after 1959, as defending champion with another European champion in the field). It placed 6th in the inaugural 1960 Olympiad tournament and won the 1964 and 1968 renditions. After 1969 there were some retirements, including Avarelli's, and some rearrangements, including Belladonna's and Garozzo's establishment of their partnership. In 1975 Italy won its last open team world championship (until 2005) with Belladonna and Garozzo alone "survivors from the great Blue Team".

Runners-up
 Bermuda Bowl 1976, 1979, 1983
 World Team Olympiad 1976

European championships
Wins
 European Open Teams (10) 1956, 1957, 1958, 1959, 1965, 1967, 1969, 1971, 1973, 1979 

Runners-up
 European Open Teams (3) 1962, 1977, 1983

References

External links 
 
 
  (including 5 "from old catalog")

1923 births
1995 deaths
Italian contract bridge players
Bermuda Bowl players
Contract bridge writers
Sportspeople from Rome
Place of birth missing